The 2009–10 Egyptian Premier League is the fifty-third season of the Egyptian Premier League since its establishment in 1948. A total of 16 teams are contesting the league, with Al Ahly the defending champions for the fifth year in a row and for the thirty-fourth time in total. The Egyptian season began on 6 August 2009 and ended on 17 May 2010.

The defending champions, Al Ahly, won its sixth league title in a row after a 3–0 win against Mansoura.

Overview

Promotion and relegation
Teams promoted from 2008–09 Egyptian Second Division
 Group A: El Entag El Harby
 Group B: El Mansoura
 Group C: Gouna

Teams relegated to 2009–10 Egyptian Second Division
 Itesalat
 Tersana
 Olympi

Teams and stadiums

The recently opened Borg El Arab Stadium in Alexandria its capacity 80,000 is currently mainly used for international competitions for Egyptian National Team, it was constructed as part of Egypt's failed bid to land the 2010 FIFA World Cup.  However, there is speculation that League sides from Alexandria will eventually call it their home grounds. Cairo International Stadium is home to Egypt giants Al Ahly and Al-Zamalek and Ismailia Stadium is home to Al-Ismaily.

Personnel and sponsoring

Managerial changes

Table and results

League table

Top 2 teams qualify for the 2011 CAF Champions League.
Egyptian Cup winner & 3rd place team qualify for the 2011 CAF Confederation Cup.
Bottom 3 teams are relegated to the Egyptian Second Division for the 2010–11 season.

Results

Season statistics

Scoring
 First goal of the season: Ramy Rabie for Al-Mokawloon against El Geish, 5 minutes. (6 August 2009).
 Fastest goal in a match: 33 seconds – Shikabala for Zamalek against Petrojet. (20 August 2009).
 Goal scored at the latest point in a match: 90+2 minutes and 29 seconds – Sayed Mosaad for Zamalek against Al-Mokawloon (24 August 2009).
 First penalty kick of the season: 77 minutes – Ahmed Hossam Mido (Missed) for Zamalek against Petrojet (20 August 2009).

Discipline
First yellow card of the season: Amr Al-Sulaya for El Mansoura against Ismaily, 10 minutes (6 August 2009).
First red card of the season: Hussein Ali for ENPPI against Gouna, 77 minutes (25 August 2009).

Goalscorers

Last updated: 24 May 2010; Source:

Top scorers

Broadcasting
When Al Ahly announced that their satellite channel will have the exclusive satellite rights of airing the team's domestic games but they will be broadcast terrestrially as usual the problem began. After that EFA have earlier announced their rejection of Al-Ahly's proposal that club's channel and ESC would be the only satellite broadcaster due to the Association's running contract with other satellite networks to air all league games. After that Al-Ahly president Hassan Hamdy confirmed that the club is still keen on maintaining their rights of exclusive satellite broadcasting to the club's league football games. In October 2008 A Bahraini corporation has made a bid of EGP 200 million to acquire the Egyptian League broadcasting exclusive rights, The company is also interested in televising and promoting the Egyptian cup games as well as Egypt's international matches, It is worth noting that the EFA's current EGP 18-million deal with several satellite channels will run out by the end of the ongoing season. After that several TV networks have decided to sue the Egyptian FA (EFA) and the public Radio and TV Union (ERTU) after being prevented from broadcasting a league game for Ahly. Zamalek chairman Mohamed Amer said his club might follow in the footsteps of arch-rivals Al Ahly in demanding the exclusive rights to broadcast their home league games. January, 2009 Egyptian Football Association (EFA) president Samir Zaher said that the league games' broadcasting row will be resolved before the upcoming Cairo derby. In April 2009 the Egyptian FA reached an agreement with IMG Media Company to sell the rights of broadcasting the Premier League next season, The company made an amazing offer, guaranteeing at least a EGP 140million revenue. They will also cost us nothing if they failed to reach that target. Before the Egyptian Super Cup, Egyptian FA president Samir Zaher said the local Super Cup between Al Ahly and Haras El Hodood, which is scheduled for 21 July, would not be televised as the row over broadcasting rights intensified, TV viewers will not be able to watch the season curtain-raiser after a seven-member committee failed to reach an agreement with the Egyptian Radio and Television Union (ERTU) over airing domestic games for next season, As the committee, which includes several clubs like Cairo duo Al Ahly and El Zamalek in addition to the FA, did not accept the Egyptian Radio and Television Union (ERTU)'s offer to broadcast league and cup matches for EGP90 million. After 4 days the ERTU has acquired the broadcasting rights of the Super Cup match between Al Ahly and Haras El Hodood for EGP1.25 million, The first week of the Egyptian premier league have not been broadcasting on the cable channels but only on the state TV channels. On 19 August 2009 (the second week of the league) Egyptian premier league clubs did not allow the state TV to air Wednesday's Egyptian Premier League matches after both parties failed to reach an agreement over the ongoing broadcasting saga, Only the first half of Haras El Hodood and El Geish match was broadcast while usual TV viewers had to listen to radio to follow game between title holders Al-Ahly and Ittihad El-Shorta. Zamalek will follow in the footsteps of those teams after deciding not to broadcast Thursday's match against Petrojet as Zamalek's spokesman Sabri Serag said on the club's official website. Finally after nearly two years and half the Egyptian Premier League broadcasting saga had been resolved, on Thursday 20 August 2009 this means that Thursday's league games will be broadcast live.  Local Channel 2 and the Egyptian Satellite Channel are entitled to broadcast games for free, while private cable networks will be charged EGP 8million each per season.

See also
Egypt Cup 2009-10
Egyptian Super Cup
List of football clubs in Egypt
Cairo derby

References

External links
RSSSF
RSSSF competition history

1
1
Egypt